Peter Schmidt (born 3 December 1943) is an Austrian footballer. He played in two matches for the Austria national football team from 1966 to 1967.

References

External links
 

1943 births
Living people
Austrian footballers
Austria international footballers
Place of birth missing (living people)
Association footballers not categorized by position